Lundby and Lundbye are place names and surnames of Scandinavian origin. They may refer to:

Places

Denmark
 Lundby, Aalborg, a village near Gistrup in Aalborg Municipality
 Battle of Lundby, fought near Lundby, Aalborg in 1864 during the Second War of Schleswig
 Lundby, Svendborg Municipality, a village in Svendborg Municipality
 Lundby, Vordingborg Municipality, a village in Vordingborg Municipality

Sweden
 Lundby, Gothenburg, a suburb of Gothenburg
 Lundby Old Church, in Lundby, Gothenburg
 , a suburb of Örebro
 , a parish in the Diocese of Västerås, Sweden

People 
 Anders Andersen-Lundby (1841–1923), Danish landscape painter
 Daniel Lundby (born 1976/77), U.S. politician in Iowa, son of Mary Lundby
 Johan Thomas Lundbye (1818–1848), Danish painter and graphic artist
 Maren Lundby (born 1994), Norwegian ski jumper
 Mary Lundby (1948–2009), U.S. politician in Iowa, mother of Daniel Lundby
 Preben Lundbye (born 1950), Danish football player and coach
 Thor-Erik Lundby (1937–2015), Norwegian ice hockey player
 Wanja Lundby-Wedin (born 1952), Swedish trade unionist

Other uses 
 Lundby (company), a Swedish maker of dollhouses
 Lundby IF, a football club located in Hisingen, Göteborg, Sweden

See also 
 Lundby, disambiguation page on Danish Wikipedia which includes additional entries
 Lundby, disambiguation page on Swedish Wikipedia which includes additional entries

Surnames of Scandinavian origin